Crăciuneşti may refer to several places in Romania:

Crăciunești, a commune in Mureș County
Crăciuneşti, a village in Cobia Commune, Dâmboviţa County
Crăciuneşti, a village in Băiţa Commune, Hunedoara County
Crăciuneşti, a village in Bocicoiu Mare Commune, Maramureș County
Crăciuneşti, a village in Rebricea Commune, Vaslui County